Kimbolton may refer to:

Places
Kimbolton, Cambridgeshire, town in Cambridgeshire, England
Kimbolton School
Kimbolton Castle
RAF Kimbolton, an airfield 
Kimbolton railway station, former railway station
Kimbolton, Herefordshire, village in Herefordshire, England
Kimbolton, Ohio, census-designated place in Ohio, United States
Kimbolton, New Zealand, village in North Island, New Zealand
Kimbolton, Victoria, Locality in Victoria, Australia

Other
Kimbolton Fireworks, the UK's last fireworks manufacturer, based in Kimbolton, Cambridgeshire